The RDI PowerLite is a series of SPARC-based laptops and mobile workstations marketed by RDI Computer Corporation, now owned by Tadpole Computer.

PowerLite models were all based on Sun's sun4m architecture, and were fully compatible with all operating systems and software developed for them. All models had support for two 2.5" SCSI hard drives and one floppy drive or PCMCIA adapter, or three 2.5" SCSI hard drives. 104-key keyboards and trackballs were also included. In addition, there were docking stations available, with SBus slots and additional 3.5" hard drive bays.

A ruggedized model was also released, the RUGGEDIZED PowerLite, with one floppy drive and PCMCIA standard, and an optional CD-ROM or DAT drive.

Notes

Mobile workstations